The 1989 Giro d'Italia was the 72nd edition of the Giro d'Italia, one of cycling's Grand Tours. The field consisted of 197 riders, and 141 riders finished the race.

By rider

By nationality

References

1989 Giro d'Italia
1989